Léa Cristina Lexa Araújo da Fonseca (born February 22, 1995), better known by her stage name Lexa, is a Brazilian singer, songwriter and dancer. In September 2015, Lexa released her debut studio album, titled Disponível. Five singles were released from this album.

Biography
Léa Cristina Araujo da Fonseca, known professionally as Lexa, was born in the city of Rio de Janeiro on February 22, 1995, to music producer Darlin Ferrattry. The stage name "Lexa" was created by adding an 'x' to her birth-name, Léa as a tribute to Brazilian presenter Xuxa Meneghel. She joined the Brazilian carnival at a very young age because her mother had a lot of roles inside Samba schools, what influenced her a lot to start her professional career. She learned to play the tambourine when she was 11 years old, and after this, she started her artistic career. She was the muse of Mocidade drums (a famous Samba School), also the queen of Unidos de Bangu, and now she is the queen of Unidos da Tijuca, as she mentioned in an interview with Vanity Teen Magazine.

Career

2014–present: Disponível
Lexa's first single, Posso Ser, was released in December 2014. The song was featured on Brazil Hot 100 Airplay Top 30 singles. The extended play (EP) contains three new tracks in addition to the 2014 single. The same EP was re-released in April 2015 and also included the bonus track "Delete". Later that year Lexa launched a second song,"Parra de Marra" whose music video was released the following month.

Disponível, Lexa's debut album, launched on September 18, 2015, under the Som Livre label. The album consists of thirteen tracks and includes compositions from Naldo Benny, Umberto Tavares, Batutinha and the artist herself. The title track, "Disponível" was released the same month as the first single. On December 12, 2015, Lexa began the Disponível Tour with a debut show in Rio de Janeiro.

Management 
Lexa formerly partnered with Kamilla Fialho, of K2l, in launching her career. The partnership ended, with Lexa choosing to leave the company. A suit was later filed by Fialho concerning the right to use the name "Lexa" after Araújo's departure. The dispute was settled out of court, with both parties reported as satisfied with the outcome. Lexa was reported in May 2016, as having joined the Mallupy Entertainment group, owned by Netto Maluppy and Thiago Basso.

Personal life
Lexa has been dating rapper MC Guimê since December 2015. They became engaged in 2017.

In 2022, Lexa and MC Guimê performed together dressed as Maria Bonita and Lampião in the reality singing competition The Masked Singer Brasil.

Awards and nominations

Discography

 Disponível (2015)
 LEXA (2020)

Tours

Headlining
 Disponível Tour (2015–2016)
 Turnê Só Depois do Carnaval (2019-2020) 
 Turnê LEXA (2021-2022)

Opening act
 Tour Love   (2016)

Reality and variety shows

References

External links

 

 

 01
1995 births
Living people
Brazilian female dancers
Brazilian women pop singers
Brazilian women singer-songwriters
Brazilian singer-songwriters
Funk carioca musicians
Latin music songwriters
Musicians from Rio de Janeiro (city)
21st-century Brazilian singers
21st-century Brazilian women singers
Women in Latin music